Tyfarnham is a civil parish in County Westmeath, Ireland.

Tyfarnham civil parish comprises 11 townlands: Ballyedward, Ballynagall, Down, Garraree, Kilmaglish, Knockatee, Knockdrin, Lugnagullagh, Multyfarnham or Fearbranagh, Parsonstown and Tyfarnham. The major part of Tyfarnham is split into two parts by Stonehall civil parish but also has two isolated townlands south of Lough Owel, Ballyedward and Lugnagullah.

The neighbouring civil parishes are: Stonehall to the north, Taghmon to the east, Leny, Portnashangan and Rathconnell (barony of Moyashel and Magheradernon) to the south, and Multyfarnham to the west. This excludes neighbours of Ballyedward and Lugnagullah.

References

External links
Tyfarnham civil parish at the IreAtlas Townland Data Base
Tyfarnham civil parish at Townlands.ie
Tyfarnham civil parish at Logainm.ie

Civil parishes of County Westmeath